2039 Payne-Gaposchkin, provisional designation , is a carbonaceous Themistian asteroid from the outer regions of the asteroid belt, approximately 14 kilometers in diameter. The asteroid was discovered on 14 February 1974, by astronomers at the George R. Agassiz Station of the Harvard College Observatory in Massachusetts, United States. It was named for British–American astronomer Cecilia Payne-Gaposchkin.

Classification and orbit 

Payne-Gaposchkin is a member of the Themis family, a dynamical family of carbonaceous asteroids with nearly coplanar ecliptical orbits, located in the outer-belt main. It orbits the Sun at a distance of 2.8–3.6 AU once every 5 years and 8 months (2,070 days). Its orbit has an eccentricity of 0.13 and an inclination of 3° with respect to the ecliptic. The body's observation arc begins with its official discovery observation at Oak Ridge in 1974.

Physical characteristics 

Pan-STARRS photometric survey characterized Payne-Gaposchkin as a carbonaceous C-type asteroid.

Lightcurves 

In October 2011, a rotational lightcurve of Payne-Gaposchkin was obtained from photometric observations in the S-band by astronomers at the Palomar Transient Factory in California. Lightcurve analysis gave a longer than average rotation period of 27.6329 hours with a brightness amplitude of 0.24 magnitude.

Diameter and albedo 

According to the survey carried out by the NEOWISE mission of NASA's Wide-field Infrared Survey Explorer, Payne-Gaposchkin measures 13.612 and 13.7 kilometers in diameter and its surface has an albedo of 0.09 and 0.095, respectively. The Collaborative Asteroid Lightcurve Link assumes a standard albedo for Themistian asteroids of 0.08 and calculates a diameter of 13.55 kilometers based on an absolute magnitude of 12.7.

Naming 

This minor planet was named after British–American astronomer Cecilia Payne-Gaposchkin (1900–1979), who was a Harvard professor of astronomy and staff member of the Smithsonian Astrophysical Observatory. Considered a pioneer of modern astrophysics, her research focused on high luminosity and variable stars including giants and supergiants, as well as novae and supernovae. Payne-Gaposchkin also authored several astronomy textbooks on variable stars. The official  was published by the Minor Planet Center on 15 October 1977.

References

External links 
 Asteroid Lightcurve Database (LCDB), query form (info )
 Dictionary of Minor Planet Names, Google books
 Asteroids and comets rotation curves, CdR – Observatoire de Genève, Raoul Behrend
 Discovery Circumstances: Numbered Minor Planets (1)-(5000) – Minor Planet Center
 
 

002039
002039
Named minor planets
19740214